Hesperusbahnen  (Hesperus’ Path) op. 279 is a Viennese Waltz composed by Josef Strauss.

This work was premiered in Musikverein on April 4 1870. Dedication destination was the vienna Artists Association „Hesperus (Venus)“. Song Title has two meanings of Venus′s orbit and Artists Association′s history.

Vienna newspaper Morgen-Post said on 6 April 1870, 

Josef had died suddenly in the three months after the premiere. Therefore, this waltz is called the „Josef Strauss’s last masterpiece“.

Introduction.

Vienna New Year's Concert 
The advent of the Vienna New Year's Concertis as follows.
2013 – Franz Welser-Möst

Bibliography 
CD „The Best of Josef STRAUSS“ – [4] Hesperus-bahnen. Walzer (Hesperus’ Path. Waltz), Op. 279
CD „Josef Strauss (1827-1870) Edition Vol. 7“ – [10] Hesperus-bahnen. Walzer (Hesperus’ Path. Waltz), Op. 279

External links 

Compositions by Josef Strauss
Waltzes
1870 compositions